Hollywood Girls Night is an American reality television series that aired on the TV Guide Network from November 27, 2011 to April 1, 2012. The series focuses on Ali Landry and Alison Sweeney as they host a girls night. The series is executive produced by Landry and Sweeney. No word has been announced on whether or not the series will return

Premise
The series follows Landry and Sweeney (known as the two "Ali's") and their attempt to throw their own girls night with their celebrity guests. Guests include Carnie Wilson, Tamera Mowry, Kristian Alfonso, Debbie Gibson, Patti Stanger, Daisy Fuentes, Garcelle Beauvais, Brooke Burns, Cheryl Burke, Kendra Wilkinson, Robin Givens, Tracey Gold, Kyle Richards, Sheryl Underwood, Denise Richards, La La Anthony and Niecy Nash

Episodes

2010s American reality television series
2011 American television series debuts
2012 American television series endings
Pop (American TV channel) original programming